Crew Green railway station was a station to the east of Criggion, Powys, Wales. The station opened in 1871 and closed in 1932.

References

Further reading

Disused railway stations in Powys
Railway stations in Great Britain opened in 1871
Railway stations in Great Britain closed in 1932